The Devil's Nightmare is a 1971 supernatural horror film directed by Jean Brismée and starring Erika Blanc, Jean Servais, Daniel Emilfork, and Lucien Raimbourg. Its plot follows a group of tourists who spend the night in a historic castle owned by a family plagued by curses and Satanism.

Plot

Baron von Rhoneberg, a former World War II German general, sacrificed his daughter as the war ended. He did so because his family was placed under a terrible curse; the first-born female of every generation was to become a succubus. Many years later, he tells the story to a reporter who wishes to write an article about it and take pictures of his castle. However, the Baron opposes any photographs being taken. Despite his protests, the young woman goes up to visit the castle and takes pictures but is killed when a dry thunderstorm suddenly rolls in while she is in close proximity to it. Her body is taken back to the town, where it is discovered she has a burn in the shape of a cloven hoof on her arm, which is confirmed as the Mark of the Devil.

Sometime later, a group of tourists become stranded when the bridge they have to cross has been destroyed in a flood. They meet Satan in the guise of a strange-looking man who recommends that they take the ferry boat, but they arrive too late to catch the last ferry of the day. They are then directed to an old castle that offers room and board. When they arrive, one of the doors opens by itself, and a piece of the façade breaks off, nearly killing one of the tourists. Hans, the butler, greets them and shows them to their rooms, giving them a briefing of the history of three of the rooms, one of which bears the same cloven hoof mark on the floor tiles in front of the fireplace. After the guests have been accommodated to their rooms, Hans goes down to a laboratory basement and informs the Baron who is practicing alchemy. Over dinner, the Baron explains his family's history to his guests. His ancestor made a pact and sold his soul to the Devil in exchange for his services. Satan demanded that the eldest daughter of each generation become a succubus. When asked if he ever had a daughter, he shakes his head no.

A young woman named Lisa Müller also comes to stay at the castle and proceeds to seduce each tourist according to their own personal weaknesses, then kills them, using their own sin against them. Each tourist is a representative of one of the Seven Deadly Sins. Matt Ducard represents Gluttony and dies by choking to death while gorging on food and wine. Nancy dies representing Greed by drowning in a hidden treasure hoard of powdered gold. Howard, representing Envy, is killed when he is guillotined, and Corrine, embodying Lust, is murdered when she is trapped inside an iron maiden while they are in the middle of an adulterous tryst. Short-tempered old Mr. Mason represents Wrath and dies when he is thrown out of a window and is impaled on an iron fence below. Regine dies as Sloth when a snake kills her in her sleep. Only the seminarian, Alvin Sorelle as Pride, seems immune to Lisa's seductive charms. When six of the seven tourists are dead, Satan appears to Alvin. Alvin offers his soul if Satan returns the dead tourists to life, to which Satan agrees. The next morning, Alvin awakes to find that the dead tourists have indeed been returned to life as though the previous night's events never happened and are having breakfast before they set out to continue their trip. Even Alvin himself remembers it as only a dream.

The Baron is wounded that morning in a fencing accident with Hans, and Alvin waits with him for an ambulance. The Baron confesses to Alvin that he lied; he did have a daughter and killed her in her cradle. After a conversation with Martha, the housekeeper, Alvin learns that the child the Baron stabbed was not the succubus. Lisa is Martha's daughter from an affair with the Baron's brother, Rudolph von Rhoneberg, and Lisa is the eldest daughter. Alvin dismisses Martha's claims that Lisa is subsequently a succubus. Alvin chooses to remain at the castle with Lisa while the other tourists go on. As Alvin and Lisa watch the tour bus heading back to the main road, the bus suddenly swerves to miss a funeral wagon driven by Satan and goes over a cliff, killing everyone aboard. Alvin enfolds Lisa in his arms. Lisa and Satan smile at each other, knowing they have claimed their souls once again.

Cast

Release
The Devil's Nightmare was released theatrically in Belgium on 14 November 1971. In the United States, the film was acquired by Hemisphere Pictures, who released it regionally in October 1972, with drive-in screenings in San Francisco and Ogden, Utah. In England, the film was released on 27 December 1972.

The film was released in the United States again in 1974, screening as part of a triple-feature in Los Angeles with In the Devil's Garden (1971) and The Devil's Wedding Night (1973).

It had several alternative titles in English-speaking territories, including The Devil Walks at Midnight, Succubus, Vampire Playgirls, Satan's Playthings, and Castle of Death.

Critical reception 

Author Howard Hughes described it as an apparently cheaply produced but "effective modern gothic". On the other hand, Allmovie wrote the film "is steeped in spooky atmosphere", but "has little else to offer."

Linda Gross of the Los Angeles Times noted that the "succuba is well played by beautiful Erika Blanc, who looks a lot like Raquel Welch," adding that the film's makeup is "outstanding."

Home media
Image Entertainment released The Devil's Nightmare on DVD in 1998 under their "Redemption" series. Mondo Macabro issued a Blu-ray of the film in 2019 featuring a new 2K restoration.

Related works

Novelization 

The film's screenwriter Patrice Rondard, who frequently used the pseudonym Patrice Rhomm for his literary and cinema industry work, also wrote a novelization entitled Au service du Diable. The 216-page French language paperback was published by Galliera in April, 1971 to coincide with the film's European theatrical release. Galliera issued the book as the first volume in their Bibliothèque de l'étrange (Strange Library) series, and it features a full color illustration on the paper cover depicting Erika Blanc and Daniel Emilfork as their respective characters that is moderately different from the artwork used for theatrical release posters.

Remake 
Dave Zagorski filmed a remake in 2012 under the Mad Z Productions banner (the US remake of the film). Devanny Pinn and Seregon O'Dassey starred in the film.

References

Sources

External links

1970s French-language films
1970s Italian films
1970s supernatural horror films
1971 films
1971 horror films
1971 LGBT-related films
Belgian horror films
Belgian LGBT-related films
Films scored by Alessandro Alessandroni
Films set in castles
Films set in West Germany
French-language Belgian films
Italian haunted house films
Italian supernatural horror films
LGBT-related horror films
Seven deadly sins in popular culture
Succubi in film
The Devil in film